Alocasia macrorrhizos is a species of flowering plant in the arum family (Araceae) that it is native to rainforests of Maritime Southeast Asia, New Guinea, and Queensland and has long been cultivated in South Asia, the Philippines, many Pacific islands, and elsewhere in the tropics. Common names include giant taro, ape, giant alocasia, biga, and pia. In Australia it is known as the cunjevoi (a term which also refers to a marine animal).

History

The giant taro was originally domesticated in the Philippines, but are known from wild specimens to early Austronesians in Taiwan. From the Philippines, they spread outwards to the rest of Maritime Southeast Asia and eastward to Oceania where it became one of the staple crops of Pacific Islanders. They are one of the four main species of aroids (taros) cultivated by Austronesians primarily as a source of starch, the others being Amorphophallus paeoniifolius, Colocasia esculenta, and Cyrtosperma merkusii, each with multiple cultivated varieties. Their leaves and stems are also edible if cooked thoroughly, though this is rarely done for giant taro as it contains higher amounts of raphides which cause itching.

Modern cognates in Maritime Southeast Asia and Micronesia include Rukai vi'a or bi'a; Ifugao bila; Ilocano, Cebuano, and Bikol biga; Tiruray bira; Ngaju biha; Malagasy via; Malay and  Acehnese birah; Mongondow biga; Palauan bísə; Chamorro piga; Bima wia; Roti and Tetun fia; Asilulu hila; and Kowiai fira. In Oceania, cognates for it include Wuvulu and Aua pia; Motu and 'Are'are hira; Kilivila and Fijian via; and Hawaiian pia. Note that in some cases, the cognates have shifted to mean other types of taro.

Indigenous Australian names included pitchu in the Burnett River (Queensland); cunjevoi (South Queensland); hakkin Rockhampton (Queensland); bargadga or nargan of the Cleveland Bay. 
The Yugarabul word for the plant, bundal, is also where the name of the suburb Boondall is derived from.

Uses

It is edible if cooked for a long time but its sap irritates the skin due to calcium oxalate crystals, or raphides which are needle like. Plants harvested later will have more raphides. Alocasia species are commonly found in marketplaces in Samoa and Tonga and other parts of Polynesia. The varieties recognized in Tahiti are the Ape oa, haparu, maota, and uahea. The Hawaiian saying: Ai no i ka ape he maneo no ka nuku (The eater of ape will have an itchy mouth) means "there will be consequences for partaking of something bad".

The giant heart-shaped leaves make impromptu umbrellas in tropical downpours.

Anthelme Thozet in 1866 documented the method of preparation: "The young bulbs, of a light rose colour inside, found growing on large old rhizomes, are scraped, divided into two parts, and put under hot ashes for about half an hour. When sufficiently baked, they are then pounded by hard strokes between two stones – a large one, Wallarie, and a small one, Kondola. All the pieces which do not look farinaceous, but watery when broken, are thrown away; the others, by strokes of the Kondola, are united by twos or threes, and put into the fire again ; they are then taken out and pounded together in the form of a cake, which is again returned to the fire and carefully turned occasionally. This operation is repeated eight or ten times, and when the hakkin, which is now of a green-greyish colour, begins to harden, it is fit for use."

See also
Domesticated plants and animals of Austronesia

References

External links
More Information On Alocasia Macrorrhiza
Alocasia Macrorrhiza Growing Tips
http://www.canoeplants.com/ape.html

macrorrhizos
Plants described in 1839
Flora of Malesia
Flora of Papuasia
Flora of Queensland
Plants described in 1753
Taxa named by Carl Linnaeus